Grey kangaroo is a kangaroo that is grey. Species include:

 Eastern grey kangaroo (Macropus giganteus)
 Western grey kangaroo (Macropus fuliginosus)